The Workshop is a 2017 French drama film directed by Laurent Cantet. It was screened in the Un Certain Regard section at the 2017 Cannes Film Festival.

Plot
Olivia, a well-known Parisian novelist, runs a writing workshop with a group of young people in La Ciotat, in the South of France. She is particularly intrigued by Antoine, a taciturn and not very sociable, young man. Antoine makes writing proposals that others consider shocking, and becomes the "black sheep" of the group. Olivia and Antoine, who seeks escape from his daily life by immersing himself in an extreme right-wing ideology (following Luc Borel, a fascist leader inspired from real-life Alain Soral), develop a relationship that is marked by attraction and repulsion.

Cast
 Marina Foïs as Olivia Dejazet
 Matthieu Lucci as Antoine

Reception
On review aggregator Rotten Tomatoes, the film holds an approval rating of 86% based on 35 reviews, with a weighted average rating of 7.4/10. On Metacritic, the film has a weighted average score of 76 out of 100, based on 11 critics, indicating "generally favorable reviews".

References

External links
 

2017 films
2017 drama films
2010s French-language films
French drama films
Films directed by Laurent Cantet
2010s French films